South American Basketball Championship for Women was first played in 1946. Female teams from South America take part in this tournament, which often has been played biannually.

Summaries

Performances by nation

See also

 South American Basketball Championship

References

External links
 South America Basketball Championship for Women on FIBA Americas
 2022 Tournament

 
Women's basketball competitions in South America between national teams
Recurring sporting events established in 1946
1946 establishments in South America
Basketball